| tries = 60
| top point scorer = 
| top try scorer = 
| Player of the tournament =
| website = 
| previous year = 2021–22
| previous tournament = 2021–22 Rugby Europe Trophy
| next year = 2023–24
| next tournament = 2023–24 Rugby Europe Trophy
}}
The 2022–23 Rugby Europe Trophy is the sixth season of the second premier rugby union competition for European national teams outside the Six Nations Championship which itself is a part of the Rugby Europe International Championships. The confirmed teams that are competing include  Croatia, Lithuania, Switzerland, Sweden and Ukraine.

Participants

Table

Fixtures 
Notes:
 Fixture reversed due to the Swedish RFU having no stadium available

See also
 Rugby Europe International Championships
 Six Nations Championship

References

External links
 Rugby Europe - Official Site

2022–23 Rugby Europe International Championships
Rugby Europe Trophy